The Strange Message in the Parchment is the fifty-fourth volume in the Nancy Drew Mystery Stories series. It was first published in 1977 under the pseudonym Carolyn Keene. The actual author was ghostwriter Harriet Stratemeyer Adams.

Plot summary       
A sheep farmer receives a mysterious telephone call shortly after he buys a series of pictures painted on parchment. "Decipher the message in the parchment and right a great wrong," the voice says. Puzzled, the owner asks Nancy to help.

With Junie, his daughter, Nancy tracks down a kidnapper and a group of extortionists. Clues weave in and out of several puzzles, two of which are linked with Italy. Is there a connection between the message in the parchment and a boy artist on another farm? And who is responsible for the atmosphere of fear in the neighborhood?

After several harrowing experiences, Nancy begins to tighten the net around a ruthless villain and calls on the assistance of her friends Ned, Burt, Dave, Bess and George to bring his nefarious schemes to a dead end.

References

Nancy Drew books
1977 American novels
1977 children's books
Grosset & Dunlap books
Children's mystery novels